The Codex Hersfeldensis was a manuscript from the Early Middle Ages. Written between 830 and 850, the codex was found in Hersfeld Abbey in the first half of the 15th century. The codex was brought to Italy by Enoch of Ascoli in 1455, where it was divided up and copied. The original has since been lost. The Codex Hersfeldensis is considered to be the original source for the surviving manuscripts of the Opera Minora – the shorter works of Tacitus, including the Germania.

In 1425, Heinrich von Grebenstein, a Hersfeld monk visiting Rome, informed the apostolic secretary, humanist, and collector of Latin manuscripts, Poggio Bracciolini, of the discovery of copies of ancient works at the abbey. Grebenstein sent a list of the works to Poggio who recognized the value of the finds and sent his agent Niccolò Niccoli to Hersfeld to obtain a detailed inventory. In 1431, Niccoli identified three writings of Tacitus as works contained within the codex (Germania, Agricola, Dialogus de oratoribus), as well as a fragment of Suetonius's De grammaticis et rhetoribus from De viris illustribus with their incipit and volume in folia:

 Cornelii Taciti De origine et situ Germanorum liber, […] xii folia
 Cornelii Taciti De vita Iulii Agricolae, […] xiiii folia
 Dialogus de oratoribus, […] xviii folia
 Suetonii Tranquilli De grammaticis et rhetoribus, […] folia vii

Though Poggio tried to obtain it for himself, the codex was not brought to Rome until Enoch of Ascoli acquired it as part of Pope Nicholas V's search for books in Germany and Northern Europe. After a few copies were made of the individual works, the manuscript disappeared without a trace.

The only existing manuscript that is considered a direct copy of the Codex Hersfeldensis is the Codex Aesinas Latinus 8, discovered in 1908 (catalogued as Codex Vittorio Emanuele 1631 in the Biblioteca Nazionale Centrale di Roma). The humanist Stefano Guarnieri created the Aesinas in the period after Pietro Candido Decembrio described the Codex Hersfeldensis, no later than 1474. It contains parts of the Agricola, the full Germania, as well as other writings. Eight folia written in Carolingian minuscule are included in the Agricola section. This Agricola fragment is generally considered to be the only original piece of the Codex Hersfeldensis that has survived to the present day.

References 
 Ludwig Pralle: Die Wiederentdeckung des Tacitus. Verlag Parzeller, Fulda 1952
Bernhard Bischoff: Das benediktinische Mönchtum und die Überlieferung der klassischen Literatur. In: Studien und Mitteilungen zur Geschichte des Benediktiner-Ordens 92 (1981), S. 165–190, hier S. 181.
Michael Fleck: Der Codex Hersfeldensis des Tacitus: eine abenteuerliche Geschichte aus der Zeit der Renaissance. In: Hersfelder Geschichtsblätter. Band 1 (2006), S. 98–113.
Heinz Heubner: Die Überlieferung der Germania des Tacitus. In: Herbert Jankuhn, Dieter Timpe (Hrsg.): Beiträge zum Verständnis der Germania des Tacitus. Bericht über die Kolloquien der Kommission für die Altertumskunde Nord- und Mitteleuropas im Jahr 1986. Teil 1. Vandenhoeck & Ruprecht, Göttingen 1989, ISBN 3-525-82459-9, S. 16–26.
Harald Merklin: ′Dialogus′-Probleme in der neueren Forschung. In: Wolfgang Haase et al. (Hrsg.): Aufstieg und Niedergang der römischen Welt II. Prinzipat, Band 33,3. Walter  de Gruyter, Berlin/New York 1991. ISBN 3-11-012541-2, S. 2255–2283.
Dieter Mertens: Die Instrumentalisierung der „Germania“ des Tacitus durch die deutschen Humanisten. In: Heinrich Beck (Hrsg.): Zur Geschichte der Gleichung „germanisch–deutsch“: Sprache und Namen, Geschichte und Institutionen. Walter de Gruyter, Berlin/New York 2004, ISBN 978-3-11-017536-3, S. 37–101 (Ergänzungsbände zum Reallexikon der Germanischen Altertumskunde, 34; online als PDF).
 Charles E. Murgia: Review Article: The Minor Works of Tacitus. A Study in Textual Criticism Cornelii Taciti Opera minora by M. Winterbottom, R. M. Ogilvie. In: Classical Philology 72, 4 (1977), S. 323–343.
 Charles E. Murgia, R. H. Rodgers: A Tale of Two Manuscripts. In: Classical Philology 79, 2 (1984), S. 145–153.
Rodney P. Robinson: The Inventory of Niccolo Niccoli. In: Classical Philology 16, 3 (1921), S. 251–255. (online)
Franz Römer: Kritischer Problem- und Forschungsbericht zur Überlieferung der taciteischen Schriften. In: Wolfgang Haase et al. (Hrsg.): Aufstieg und Niedergang der römischen Welt II. Prinzipat, Band 33,3. de Gruyter, Berlin/New York 1991, ISBN 3-11-012541-2, S. 2299–2339.
 Rudolf Till: Handschriftliche Untersuchungen zu Tacitus Agricola und Germania, mit einer Photokopie des Codex Aesinas. Berlin-Dahlem 1943.
 Michael Winterbottom: The Manuscript Tradition of Tacitus' Germania. In: Classical Philology   70, 1 (1975), S. 1–7.

Lost documents